San Pedro Nolasco Island, sometimes called Seal Island, is a small and rugged Mexican island in the Gulf of California. It is 4.2 km long by 1 km wide, and lies 15 km from the nearest point of the Mexican coast and about 28 km west of the resort town of San Carlos on the coast of the Sonoran Desert. The island is protected as a nature reserve and its coastal waters are well known as a sport fishing and diving site.

Flora and fauna
The island is home to an endemic cactus Echinocereus websterianus.  Endemic fauna include the San Pedro Nolasco Island spinytail iguana (Ctenosaura nolascensis) and, formerly, Pemberton's deer mouse (Peromyscus pembertoni ), a rodent which is now extinct. Large numbers of California sea lions frequent its surrounding waters and use the island as a haul-out.

Popular dive sites

 Magdalena Bay
 Lighthouse
 The Little Waterfall
 The Cave
 The Beach
 La Lobera
 North Point
 The Window
 Pelican Point
 The Cavern
 The Rookery
 South Point

Magdalena Bay
Magdalena Bay is a beautiful little protected cove on the southeast corner of the island. The water depths inside the bay are shallow, making it an excellent site for novice divers and snorkelers. Consistent water clarity and amazing bio-diversity offers even the most advanced divers an unforgettable experience. The gravel beach seems to be a favorite resting place with the sea lions. Large numbers of sea lion pups, guarded by a dominant male can be observed during the summer months.

Lighthouse

The Little Waterfall

The Cave

The Beach

La Lobera

North Point

The Window

Pelican Point

The Cavern

The Rookery

South Point

Transportation and island access
Arrangements for transportation to and from San Pedro Nolasco Island can be made through numerous charter boat operators and dive shops in nearby San Carlos. However, to go ashore at San Pedro Nolasco as well as most of the Islands in the Gulf of California (Sea of Cortez) a special permit must be purchased from the Mexican government. Such permits can be obtained at the local offices of the National Commission of Protected Natural Areas (Comision Nacional de Areas Naturales Protegidas).

References

External links
http://www.conanp.gob.mx/ (Comision Nacional de Areas Naturales Protegidas)
http://www.garysdivemexico.com/ Gary's Dive Shop website

Underwater diving sites in Mexico
Islands of the Gulf of California
Islands of Sonora
Protected areas of Sonora
Nature reserves in Mexico
Articles containing video clips
Uninhabited islands of Mexico